İstanbul Ottomans R.F.C. is a professional rugby union club based in Istanbul, Turkey. Founded in 1999 by mostly French and English rugby lovers working and living in İstanbul, the Ottomans were the first rugby club to be established in the country, and, until 2006, the only chapter in the history of Turkish rugby prior to the foundation of Turkey's second rugby club, Kadıköy Rugby.

Another first of the İstanbul Ottomans was to win the very first official Turkish Rugby Union competition in the year of 2007 / 2008.

The club has participated in a number of tournaments taking place both in Turkey and abroad, and has formidably good relations with the rugby clubs of neighboring countries. With most of its players having played rugby away back since their junior years, they are a driving force and a role model of experience to other rugby players in Turkey.

The İstanbul Ottomans joined the international Ameland Beach Rugby Festival in The Netherlands in June 2008, as a first Turkish team ever to participate in this tournament. The team played under the name of the Ottoman Sevens. Out of the 64 teams within the 2-day competition, the İstanbul Ottomans just missed out a place on the podium, became 4th and had 1st place in 2009 tournament.

Current squad
 Blake, Alistair Baran
 Baykal, Anılcan
 Baykal, Onur
 Bozanoglu, Mustafa
 Bozoglu, Emre
 Bulman, Orhan
 Çakıner, Gürhan
 Çakıroğlu, Samet
 Cemiloglu, Fuat
 Cicek, Basar
 Colok, Oytun
 Delettre, Jean-François
 Dursun, Sarven
 Gandois, Florent
 Greatorex, Stephen
 Gungormus, Oguzhan
 Hebert, Yannick
 James, Tamwar
 Karadeniz, Deniz
 Küçüktuna, Salih
 Langlois, Thomas
 Matheson, Alan
 Narbay, Sertac
 Önkal, Özer Ali
 Öztuna, Çağan
 Reardon, Bryan
 Soysevinç, Ulaş
 Şapçı, Emre
 Şengelen, Yiğit
 Şirinyan, Yenovk
 Tatar, Murat Boygar
 Tezel, Murat
 Tosun, Altug
 Tuğtağ, Melih
 Turkaslan, Cansin
 Turkay, Cenk
 Belentepe, Mehmet Turgut
 Yenidogan, Deniz
 Yesil, Coskun
 Yılmazgüler, Oğuzhan
 Alkan, Vedat
 Bayraktar, Alkım
 Alçar, Ekin
 Erdem, Berk
 Yavuz, Eyüp
 Alkan, Doğukan

External links
İstanbul Ottomans Official Website
Ottoman 7s Official Website
İstanbul Ottomans Official Mail Group
Turkish Federation of Baseball, Softball, Rugby and American Football

Turkish rugby union teams